The bark mantises and ground mantises (genus Tarachodes) are praying mantids now placed in the family Eremiaphilidae that are native to the Afrotropics. They are generally light brown but more silvery on the wings. The wings are attractively reticulated, and the veins may be mottled dark and pale. The head is wider than the pronotum, which is rounded anteriorly, and doesn't overlap with the rear of the head. The pronotum is depressed, with its sides more or less parallel, and only a weak supra-coxal bulge is present. The anterior tibia are flattened and greatly expanded longitudinally, and the tibial claw does not fit into a pit between the 1st and 2nd external spines of the anterior femora, as in a few mantis groups.

These mantids are ambush predators and many species are cryptically coloured to blend in with their surroundings. Some have brightly coloured undersides which are displayed to startle and drive off assailants. Some species such as Tarachodes maurus brood their eggs, and others, such as Tarachodes afzelii, not only brood their eggs but continue to guard their young after they hatch out.

Species
Members of this genus may be called Bark mantises or Ground mantises.

See also
List of mantis genera and species

References

 
Tarachodidae
Mantodea genera
Taxa named by Hermann Burmeister